Empreguetes is a group appearing in the Brazilian telenovela Cheias de Charme. It is formed by Penha (Taís Araújo), Rosário (Leandra Leal) and Cida (Isabelle Drummond). In the telenovela, the group was formed occasionally, when the three employees were spending the night at the singer Chayene (Cláudia Abreu) while she was traveling and Rosario woke in the night and decided to write a song called "Life Empreguete" on next morning, Rosario called Kleiton (Fabio Neppo) to record music with the participation of Penha and Citizenship in studio Chayene. Then eventually record a clip on the same day, with the clothes and house rental as Chayene. The clip was posted on the Internet on May 19, 2012. In the telenovela, was published on the Internet by various characters and became a big hit, resulting in the arrest of singers newly launched.

The group is inspired by American group Destiny's Child.

Discography 
 2012 - Cheias de Charme

Singles  
 2012- Vida de Empreguete (Life of Empreguete) 
 2012- Marias Brasileiras (Brazilian Marias)
 2012 - Nosso Brilho (Our Glow)

References 

Fictional musical groups
Brazilian telenovelas